Novoagbyazovo (Yañı Äğbäz) is a rural locality (a village) in Starosharashlinsky Selsoviet, Bakalinsky District, Bashkortostan, Russia. The population was 197 as of 2010. There are 3 streets.

Geography 
Novoagbyazovo is located 14 km northwest of Bakaly (the district's administrative centre) by road. Novoalmetyevo is the nearest rural locality.

References 

Rural localities in Bakalinsky District